Irena Khubulova (born 16 June 2001) is a Russian judoka.

References

External links
 
 

2001 births
Living people
Russian female judoka
Judoka at the 2018 Summer Youth Olympics
Youth Olympic gold medalists for Russia
21st-century Russian women